was a town located in Kimotsuki District, Kagoshima Prefecture, Japan.

As of 2003, the town had an estimated population of 3,278 and a density of 42.13 persons per km2. The total area was 77.81 km2.

On March 22, 2005, Tashiro, along with the town of Ōnejime (also from Kimotsuki District), was merged to create the town of Kinkō.

References

External links
 Official website of Kinko 

Dissolved municipalities of Kagoshima Prefecture
Populated places disestablished in 2005
2005 disestablishments in Japan